Alois Tremmel (31 October 1891 – 21 November 1950) was an Austrian footballer. He played in one match for the Austria national football team in 1919.

References

External links
 

1891 births
1950 deaths
Austrian footballers
Austria international footballers
Association footballers not categorized by position